Koldewey may refer to:
Koldewey Island, an island in Franz Josef Land, Russia
Store Koldewey, an island in northeastern Greenland
11352 Koldewey, an asteroid

People
Carl Koldewey, German Arctic explorer
Heather Koldewey, British marine scientist and environmentalist
Robert Koldewey, German architect and archaeologist known for excavating Babylon